In the early hours of August 10, 1991, a mass shooting occurred at Thai Buddhist temple Wat Promkunaram in Waddell, Arizona, killing nine people. It was the deadliest mass shooting in Arizona history.

Overview
The shooting happened at the Wat Promkunaram Buddhist temple during the early hours of August 10. The victims were all linked to the temple and either Thais or of Thai descent: Pairuch Kanthong, the abbot; five monks, Surichai Anuttaro, Boochuay Chaiyarach, Chalerm Chantapim, Siang Ginggaeo, and Somsak Sopha; a nun, Foy Sripanpasert; her nephew, Matthew Miller, who was a novice monk; and a temple employee, Chirasak Chirapong. Their bodies were found on August 10, 1991, by a cook who entered the temple.

The victims were shot in the back of the head and placed face down in a circle.

Investigation

Initial arrests
After the shooting, four men from Tucson, identified as Leo Bruce, Mark Nunez, Dante Parker, and Victor Zerate, were arrested. Mike McGraw, a patient in a mental hospital in Tucson, had called sheriff's investigators in Maricopa County, saying he knew who did it and providing names.

The four people were interrogated, one for nearly 13 hours, and three confessed in writing following the interrogation. One of the suspects, Zerate, maintained his innocence and was later released, after video evidence showed him working at a dog racing operation hundreds of miles away at the time of the murder.

It was later discovered that the murder weapon did not belong to any of the four suspects. Charges against the four, later dubbed the "Tucson Four" by the media, were dropped, resulting in a major controversy over the investigation.

Later arrests
Police found the murder weapon, a .22-caliber rifle belonging to a 16-year-old, in the car of a friend of 17-year-old Johnathan Doody, an ethnic Thai born in Nakon Nayok in Thailand. That led the investigation to Doody and 16-year-old Allessandro Garcia (born June 12, 1975). According to Garcia, he and Doody went with the .22-caliber rifle and his 20-gauge shotgun to the temple and robbed it of approximately $2,600 and some A/V equipment. Garcia claimed that Doody panicked, thinking that one of the monks had recognized him as a brother of a temple-goer, then shot all of the victims in the head with the rifle, while Garcia shot four of them again in the torso with the shotgun. According to Garcia, the crime had been planned and leaving no witnesses was part of it.

Legal proceedings
Both men were charged with the crime of armed robbery and first-degree murder. Garcia pleaded guilty in 1993 to avoid the death penalty, and was sentenced to 271 years in prison. Doody was convicted in 1994 and sentenced to 281 years in prison.

Doody's attorneys later appealed, claiming Doody's father had not been present during the interrogation and that Doody's confession was not voluntary because authorities improperly administered the Miranda warning.

Doody's conviction was overturned in 2008 by the 9th Circuit Court of Appeals and again in 2011. Doody's second trial resulted in a mistrial in 2013.

The third trial concluded in January 2014 and found Doody guilty on all counts, including the nine murders. The jury based its findings on Garcia's testimony and circumstantial evidence. Doody was sentenced to 281 years in prison. Johnathan Doody was imprisoned at the Arizona State Prison Complex – Florence.

Controversy over investigation
The investigation process into the murders is now viewed as botched.

Tucson Four
The initial arrests of the Tucson Four have generated controversy over how the investigation was conducted.

Initial suspect McGraw, while offering tantalizing details on the shooting for months, was later found to be unreliable, as he had a history of making outlandish claims while he was in prison in 1988. The investigators, despite little evidence that linked McGraw the others anywhere near the crime scene at the time of the crime, deemed McGraw a reliable witness because they believed he was hospitalized as a psychiatric patient out of suicidal guilt over the killings.

It was also discovered that the investigation was beginning to focus on Doody and Garcia, following the discovery of the murder weapon. But that part of the investigation stopped after McGraw's phone call led to the Tucson Four's arrest – the actual murder weapon sat in a detective's office for weeks before being tested.

Eventually, it was discovered that the men were coerced into confessing, with investigators extracting false confessions by exaggerating evidence, badgering them with leading questions, and threatening the death penalty. A homicide chief for Maricopa County Sheriff's Office at the time said the interrogators hammered on the suspects until their will was broken, and that "after a while, they were willing to say anything."

The initial suspects, excluding McGraw, later filed lawsuits against Maricopa County, and in 1994, Bruce and Nunez received $1.1 million each, while Parker received $240,000.

Doody
Interrogation techniques similar to those used on the Tucson Four were also used against Doody and Garcia and the 9th Circuit Court of Appeals ruled that Doody's confession was illegally coerced. Gary L. Stuart, a lawyer with deep knowledge of the case, said Doody's confession never should have stood up in court.

Legacy
The investigation led to public outrage over then-Maricopa-County-Sheriff Tom Agnos. It eventually turned into a campaign issue when Joe Arpaio, who was a former DEA agent at the time, campaigned on a promise to restore credibility to the office. Agnos was eventually defeated by Arpaio in the November 1992 general election.

See also 
 Mano Laohavanich – Thailand politician with involvement in the case

Notes

References

 Citations
 

Murder in Arizona
Criminal duos
1991 in Arizona
1991 murders in the United States
Attacks in the United States in 1991
Deaths by firearm in Arizona
Mass murder in 1991
1991 mass shootings in the United States
Mass shootings in the United States
Buddhism in the United States
Massacres in religious buildings and structures
Thai American
Mass shootings in Arizona
Attacks on religious buildings and structures in the United States
Events in Maricopa County, Arizona
History of Buddhism in the United States